Eppley Airfield , also known as Omaha Airport, is an airport in the midwestern United States, located  northeast of downtown Omaha, Nebraska. On the west bank of the Missouri River in Douglas County, it is the largest airport in Nebraska, with more arrivals and departures than all other airports in the state combined. It is classified as a medium hub airport by the Federal Aviation Administration (FAA). It is owned and operated by the Omaha Airport Authority (OAA).

History
Eppley Airfield began as an extension of Levi Carter Park near East Omaha in 1925. That year, the City of Omaha acquired  of cleared land on the east side of Carter Lake. Almost immediately, planes started landing and taking off there. A lawsuit was launched against the City in 1927 when a group wanted to build a hangar there. The lawsuit failed, and the land was called both the Omaha Municipal Airport and the American Legion Airport.

The April 1957 Official Airline Guide shows 42 scheduled airline departures per day, with 23 by United Airlines and 19 by Braniff International Airways. The airport is named for Eugene C. Eppley, founder of the Eppley Hotel chain, from whose estate $1 million was used to ready the then-Omaha Municipal Airport for jet aircraft in 1959–60. This was matched by the federal government and improvements were made to handle jets at the airport, which was renamed Eppley Airfield in his honor in 1960. The first jets to land in Omaha were United Boeing 720s in August 1960.

The terminal building, opened in 1961, was designed by James C. Buckley, Inc. Concourse B opened in 1970, and was remodeled when Concourse A opened in 1986.

Omaha Airport Authority
Created in 1959, the Omaha Airport Authority is governed by a five member appointed board and is responsible for sole jurisdiction and operation of Eppley Airfield.

Hubs and operations
Midwest Airlines, then known as Midwest Express Airlines, operated a hub at Eppley Airfield from 1995 to 2002 with flights to Milwaukee, Newark, Kansas City, Los Angeles, Orlando, San Diego, and Washington–Reagan; the airport remained a focus city with nonstop flights to Milwaukee and Washington–Reagan until the airline merged with Frontier Airlines in 2009.

During 2017, Southwest Airlines, Delta Air Lines, and United Airlines were the largest carriers and served 33.7, 21.6, and 18.7 percent of passengers, respectively.

The airport has an on-site U.S. Customs and Border Protection facility that handles international, charter, and private flights. Eppley's first commercial, international flight began May 1, 2018, when Air Canada Express launched a daily flight to Toronto Pearson International Airport; this service ended on October 4, 2019.

Expansion

Construction and upgrades are planned for Eppley Airfield's facilities and infrastructure based on passenger growth milestones. An expansion to runway 18/36 will be added in order to enable larger aircraft to land, as well as an enlargement of taxiway A. Concourses A and B will be joined together by a long corridor, and expanded in the northern direction, adding 8 gates. This expansion will also consolidate passenger security screening. After expansion, there will be a total of 28 gates. On either side of the unified terminal, the ramp will be extended for overnight aircraft parking.

In January 2016, Eppley Airfield completed expansion of its on-site United States Customs and Border Protection facility (CBP) to provide greater customs and inspection services for international passengers. Eppley Airfield is classified as a "Customs Landing Rights Airport" for international flights by U.S. Customs and Border Protection. Scheduled, commercial international service began on May 1, 2018, when Air Canada Express launched a daily flight to Toronto–Pearson. That service ended on October 4, 2019. The airport also handles international cargo, charter, and private flights.

Location
The airport is northeast of downtown in east Omaha. Although the airport is in Nebraska on the west side of the Missouri River, it is surrounded on the east, west, and south by Iowa: the Missouri River formed an oxbow west of the land that became Eppley Airfield. The river cut off the oxbow during an 1877 flood, leaving behind Carter Lake on a portion of its former course; the Supreme Court ruled in 1893 that though the land cut off by the river's changed route now lay west of the Missouri, it remained part of Iowa. This land eventually became the city of Carter Lake, Iowa.

Facilities
The airfield has three runways: 14R-32L, 14L-32R, and 18-36. On average, seven airlines provide approximately 88 departures per day to 33 nonstop destinations. The airport is also serviced by seven freight companies.

Terminals
The South Terminal, including Concourse A, includes gates A1 through A10, baggage claims 1 through 3, and serves Alaska Airlines, Allegiant Air (ticket counter), American Airlines, Delta Air Lines, and Frontier Airlines. Gate assignments: Alaska Airlines (A9), American (A6-A8, A10), Delta (A2-A5), and Frontier (A1).

The North Terminal, including Concourse B, includes gates B11 through B20, baggage claims 4 through 6, and serves Allegiant Air (gate), Southwest Airlines, and United Airlines. Gate assignments: Allegiant Air (B19), Southwest (B16-B18), and United (B11-B14). Gates B15 and B20 are unassigned.

Ground transportation
The airport is near four major highways: Interstate 80, Interstate 480, Interstate 680, and Interstate 29.

The airport has a consolidated rental car facility connected to the North Terminal.

Metro Transit Line 16 provides limited weekday-only rush-hour service southbound toward downtown and northbound toward the North Omaha Transit Center. Passenger access is located directly outside the terminal.

Airlines and destinations

Passenger

Cargo

Statistics

Top destinations

Airline market share

Annual traffic

Accidents and incidents
On December 6, 1978, a Douglas DC-6 operated by the Mexican Air Force, a military flight bound for San Antonio International Airport, suffered an engine fire on takeoff and crashed into a flood-control levee at the airport boundary half a mile north of Eppley, killing all seven occupants on board. The aircraft had been undergoing maintenance for three days and was reportedly leaking oil from one of its engines as it attempted to take off.
On January 18, 2019, a Boeing 737-800 operating as Southwest Airlines Flight 1643 from Las Vegas, Nevada, carrying 150 passengers and 6 crew members slid off the runway during icy conditions.  There were no reported injuries.

See also
List of airports in Nebraska

Gallery

References

External links
 
 Eppley Airport Guide on Omaha.net
 Aviation Photos from airliners.net
 Aviation Photos from jetphotos.net
 
 

Transportation in Omaha, Nebraska
Landmarks in North Omaha, Nebraska
Airports in Nebraska
Buildings and structures in Omaha, Nebraska
Airports established in 1925
1925 establishments in Nebraska